The Philatelic Congress of Great Britain is a national congress held each year by the Association of British Philatelic Societies (ABPS).

History 
The first Congress was held in 1909 in conjunction with a stamp exhibition at Hulme Town Hall in Manchester. They continue to this day, each year in a different location.

The business of the first Congress included the formation of a National Society or Federation, the desirability of a Collectors’ Catalogue, unnecessary issues, deceased collector’s stamps and an encyclopaedia of philatelic literature.

Proceedings 
The Congress is an opportunity for philatelists to network, view displays and attend the Congress Banquet.

Each year a Congress Medal is presented and the new signatories to the Roll of Distinguished Philatelists sign the Roll.

Papers are given on philatelic subjects, for instance at the 88th Congress in 2006 David Beech of the British Library gave a paper on "The Philately of the Edwardian era as shown in its literature".

Congress Medal

The Congress Medal is a medal awarded each year at the congress, usually to a single individual, "in recognition of dedication to the hobby [philately] over many years".

The first recipient of the medal was Wilfred Haworth at the 1959 Congress in Torquay. In 2021, the medal was for the first time award jointly to two people. The original medal was designed by Ernest Hugen, but the design has since changed.

The medal is not for philatelic excellence, but for voluntary endeavours particularly at a national level. The winner is selected by the Awards Committee of the Association of British Philatelic Societies (ABPS) and must be nominated by an officer of a philatelic society affiliated to the ABPS.

Winners

References

Further reading

External links 

List of locations of past Congresses
UK Philately Awards & Congress Medal image.
ABPS Congress Medal History.

Philatelic events
1909 establishments in the United Kingdom
Recurring events established in 1909